Hoosingo is a town in the southeastern Lower Juba (Jubbada Hoose) region of Somalia.

References
Hoosingo

Populated places in Lower Juba